Bob Sessions may refer to:

Bob Sessions (actor) (1940–1998) in Angel Cop etc.
Bob Sessions (winemaker), vintner for Hanzell Vineyards 1973 - 2001